Havana Blues (Habana Blues) is a 2005 Spanish and Cuban film by Benito Zambrano which tells the story of two young musicians in Cuba. The film revolves around their music and contains criticism of problems in Cuba such as poverty and electricity outages. It was screened in the Un Certain Regard section at the 2005 Cannes Film Festival.

The two musicians, Ruy and Tito (Yoel and San Martín), whose music is a mix of traditional Cuban music and more modern music such as rap, get a chance at an international breakthrough through a Spanish record company, but they would have to change their Cuba-themed lyrics to cater to an international audience. Ruy considers this a betrayal of his country and his art, whereas Tito recognizes the financial necessity of it. At the same time, Ruy is dealing with the fact that his children and their mother Caridad (Sierra) are leaving for the United States. Art versus commerce, nationalism versus globalism, and communism versus capitalism are some of the themes of the film.

Cast
 Alberto Yoel - Ruy (as Alberto Yoel García)
 Roberto San Martín - Tito
 Yailene Sierra - Caridad
 Mayra Rodríguez - Lucía
 Ernesto Escalona - Carlitos
 Marta Calvó - Marta
 Roger Pera - Lorenzo
 Osvaldo Doimeadiós - Ruber
 Zenia Marabal - Luz María
 Laris Vega - Betty
 Jorge Alí - Nelson (as Jorge Ali Pérez)
 Félix Pérez - René
 Aurora Basnuevo - Estrellita
 Tomás Cao - Álex (as Tomás A. Cao)
 Giordano Serrano - Giordano

See also 
 List of Spanish films of 2005
 List of Cuban films

References

External links 
 Habana Blues on the Internet Movie Database.
 

2005 films
Cuban musical films
Spanish musical drama films
2000s Spanish-language films
2000s musical drama films
Films directed by Benito Zambrano
Films about music and musicians
2005 drama films
2000s Spanish films